Chinmaya Dunster (born 1954 in Kent, England) is a sarod player whose compositions incorporate elements of Celtic and Hindustani music. He is an active environmentalist and performs concerts to foster awareness for saving ecosystems and wildlife. Dunster has released over twenty CDs since 1990.

Biography
Born in 1954 in Kent, England, Dunster (né Stephen Dunster) attended Art college in Canterbury and pursued an independent study of classical guitar and composition throughout his adolescence and early twenties.

After finishing his formal education in the late seventies, Dunster left Europe and travelled through Afghanistan into northern India, where he became acquainted with classical Indian music and instrumentation. During spring break of his last year of art school in 1979, he flew off to Delhi where he attended an all-night performance of the sarod master, Ustad Amjad Ali Khan and subsequently spent the next thirteen years engaged in the study of the sarod both in London and India.

In 1982 he became a disciple of Osho (Bhagwan Shree Rajneesh).

As Hindustani musical tradition dictates that knowledge of technique and tradition is generally handed down from father to son, Dunster was initially challenged to find a teacher. In 1983 in London he became a disciple of Ustad Gurdev Singh (leading disciple of Ustad Amjad Ali Khan). After moving to Pune, India, in 1989, he studied for a further six years with Pandit Shekhar Borkar, a mainly self-taught sarod master.

In 1990, following an intense year of music making at the Osho International Meditation Resort in Pune, Dunster founded the east-west fusion band with Prem Joshua, Terra Incognita and released two albums under that name through New Earth Records. After several solo projects, Dunster then founded the Celtic Ragas Band, whose self-titled 2001 release attracted the favour of former Beatles member Sir Paul McCartney, who then invited Dunster to perform at his 2002 wedding to Heather Mills in Ireland.

The following year he and the Celtic Ragas Band performed a CONCERT FOR INDIA'S ENVIRONMENT at BVIEER, Pune, released as the live CD 'Fragrance of the East' on New Earth Records. The video of this concert, blended with interviews with environmentalists, Indian school children reading their own poems on nature and stunning footage of the Indian wilderness, was shown at numerous international film festivals, and aimed to spread awareness of the state of India’s environment:

In February 2010, Chinmaya Dunster formed the Green Ragas Band, playing at British Council, New Delhi (India) during the TERI YUVA Meet for environmental awareness, and the 2010 Commonwealth Games in Delhi. These performances resulted in Dunster's films of the concerts blended with information about climate change, threats to biodiversity and the difficulties faced by the rural poor in India.

Chinmaya Dunster currently resides in Totnes, UK  with his partner Naveena Goffer and their daughter Koyal Goffer-Dunster. In 2020 together with producer Ben Fordham he created the project MELA [www.melamusic.co.uk ] which blends Chinmaya's melodies with electro/psytrance elements. His latest compositions are  duets for classical guitar and sarod. A supporter of the aims of Extinction Rebellion, he does not use social media.

Discography

See also
 Celtic music
 New-age music
 Fusion music

References

External links

1954 births
Living people
Musicians from Kent
Sarod players
Rajneesh movement